Jam & Lewis: Volume One is the debut studio album by American R&B production duo Jimmy Jam and Terry Lewis. It was released through their label Flyte Tyme Records in conjunction with BMG on July 9, 2021.

The album contains guest appearances, including Sounds of Blackness, Boyz II Men, Mariah Carey, Babyface, Heather Headley, Charlie Wilson, Mary J. Blige, Toni Braxton and Morris Day, Jerome and the Roots.

Background and release
In April 2019, Jimmy Jam and Terry Lewis announced that they were preparing their first album as recording artists, which include "iconic collaborations spanning their influential discography" and "awe inspiring performances". As they signed with BMG Rights Management, they announced its release year in 2021.

Promotion
Jam and Lewis performed "He Don't Know Nothin' Bout It" with Babyface at The Tonight Show with Jimmy Fallon on January 18, 2021. A week later, they performed the song again at Tamron Hall on January 25.

Singles
Their debut single, "Til I Found You", which features Sounds of Blackness alongside Ann Nesby, Lauren Evans and James "Big Jim" Wright, was released as the first single from the album on April 12, 2019. The song reached number 21 on the US Gospel Airplay chart, and number 22 on the US Adult R&B Songs chart.

The second single, "He Don't Know Nothin' Bout It", featuring Babyface, was released on November 13, 2020. The song reached number 16 on the US Hot R&B Songs chart, and number four on the US Adult R&B Songs chart.

The third single, "Somewhat Loved", featuring Mariah Carey, was released on June 10, 2021. The song reached number 10 on the US Adult R&B Songs chart.

Track listing

Personnel 
Credits adapted from the CD liner notes

 Jimmy Jam - producer, engineer (3-5, 8, 10)
 Terry Lewis - producer, engineer (1-6, 8-10)
 Christian Plata - engineer (1), assistant engineer (5), mixing at Flyte Tyme Studios, Agoura Hills, CA (1)
 Matt Marrin - engineer (2, 6-8), assistant engineer (5)
 John Jackson - engineer (2, 4)
 Brant Biles - mixing at Flyte Tyme Studios, Agoura Hills, CA (2-10)
 Steve Genewick - strings engineer (3)
 Jeff Fitzpatrick - 2nd strings engineer (3)
 Brian Garten - vocal engineer (4)
 Steve Hodge - engineer (5, 10)
 Xavier Smith - assistant engineer (5, 10)
 Sergiio - Talkbox (8)
 Herb Powers Jr. - mastering at PM Mastering inc., New Jersey

Charts

References

2021 debut albums
Albums produced by Jimmy Jam and Terry Lewis